Goochland may refer to:
 Goochland County, Virginia
 Goochland, Virginia
 Goochland, Kentucky
 Goochland Cave, Rockcastle County, Kentucky